Nexity is a French company that focuses on real estate development and the provision of related services. Company was founded in 2000 in Paris.

History

Beginnings: the Arnault family
In 1971, Bernard Arnault started to work in his family business, the industrial and public works construction company Ferret-Savinel, owned by his father, Jean Léon Arnault. There he began to develop real estate activities. In 1974, he convinced his father, then CEO, to change the focus of the company, sell the division of industrial construction to Quillery and use the money to enter fully into the business of the real estate. Following that sale, Ferret-Savinel changed its name, becoming Ferinel, and, focused on the real estate market, began increasing its portfolio. In 1988, following this success, the headquarters were transferred from Roubaix to Paris and the real estate branch was renamed George V Group.

CGE steps up
The Compagnie Générale des Eaux (CGE) was established in the mid-19th century in order to provide water supply services to France's industrial cities. For the early 20th century, CGE was already one of France's largest private companies.

Through the first half of the century, CGE remained focused on its core water utilities operations. In the 1960s, however, CGE launched a new diversification strategy that led it into a variety of new markets over the next two decades, including the construction and real estate sales and development sectors. In 1979, the company increased this activity with the acquisition of Maison Phenix, a leading real state company. In 1988, CGE made another important purchase, obtaining the construction company Société Générale d'Entreprise (the future Vinci). In the 90s, during the French real estate crisis, CGE gathered all its residential real estate and development activities in a new subsidiary, called MI SA, which soon begun to be the leader of the French housing market.

In 1995, CGE bought the George V real estate division from Groupe Arnault.

CGE restructure: CGIS era
CGE became a company, with a wide range of activities (construction, telecommunications, pay television, facilities management, the operation of amusement parks, and others), but the incompatibity between its real estate and construction components led it into a crisis in the mid-1990s. CGE was restructured and the construction sector was formed into a separate company, Vinci. In 1996, the real estate branch was also reorganised into a sole subsidiary, Compagnie Générale d'Immobilier et de Services (CGIS). The lack of coordination between different areas, however, continued. CGIS had to sell many assets to stay afloat and CGE finally decided to separate from the real estate area, adopt the name Vivendi, and refocus itself as a media and communications firm. CGIS and MI were apart soon after.

European expansion and refocus: Nexity era
As a new independent company, CGIS difficulties continued. It sold its hotels to Accor and Pierre & Vacances and a number of its La Défense buildings to Unibail. In 2000 CGIS was sold in a management buyout backed by CDC Ixis Capital, LBO France, and Lehman Brothers, changing its name to Nexity. In 2001, was created the Spanish subsidiary (even though operations there were made with French property since the 1990s), as well as the Portuguese. In 2002, was established Nexity Belgium. In 2003, Nexity separate itself from its engineering services branch, Cotebo, in order to focus on property services and development. In January 2004, it strengthened its relatively weak real estate services sector with the purchase of Saggel.

In July 2007, the Nexity shareholders approved the issuance of 19997501 shares, representing a 38.2 percent stake, for the Caisse Nationale des Caisses d'Epargne et de Prévoyance (CNCE), through the Groupe Caisse d'Epargne (GCE), in exchange of a 25 percent of Crédit Foncier de France, 31.9 percent of Eurosic and 100 percent of CGE Immobilier services division, including Lamy. Later, CNCE (currently Groupe BPCE) expanded its stake to 41.4 percent.

In January 2009, Nexity sold its stake in Crédit Foncier to CNCE by 540 million euros.

Activity
Nexity operates as a real estate development company in Europe. Its working areas include residential properties, office buildings, offices, business parks, warehouses, distribution centers, office facilities, and hotels. This is carried out through several divisions.

Divisions

Nexity Enterprises
This division specialises in the development and renovation of skyscrapers and similar structures.

Geprim
Geprim centers on the development of warehouses, distribution centers and mixed-use units.

Nexity Services
Nexity Services provides services during every stage of a project design, purchase, daily management, renovation and sale.

References

Footnotes

Citations

Companies based in Paris
Real estate companies of France
Companies listed on Euronext Paris